Alexander Abramovich Krein (20 October 1883 in Nizhny Novgorod – 25 April 1951 in Staraya Ruza, Moscow Oblast) was a Soviet composer.

Background
The Krein family was steeped in the klezmer tradition; his father Abram (who moved to Russia from Lithuania in 1870) was a noted violinist. All of the seven Krein brothers received their first musical training from him and became musicians; Alexander and Grigori made names for themselves as composers, David gained a strong reputation as a violinist. Of the three Krein family composers, Alexander, his brother Grigori, and Grigori's son Julian, it is Alexander who composed the most music and thus to whom the most attention has been paid. After decades of posthumous neglect, however, his very name seems to have disappeared from international reference books.

Studies and career
In 1896, at the early age of 14, Alexander Krein entered the Moscow Conservatory where his studies included cello classes with Alexander von Glehn and composition lessons with Sergei Taneyev and Boleslav Yavorsky. His first works were published by P. Jurgenson in 1901. During the years immediately prior to the 1917 Revolution, he was on the faculty of the People's Conservatory in Moscow. In 1917, he was appointed as director of the artistic wing of the  Muzo-Narkompros, the music section of a newly formed ministry of arts and education. Throughout the 1920s, Krein was widely regarded as the leader of a Jewish national school in Russia (which included his brother Grigori and his nephew Julian). Among those he influenced were minor composers such as Sinovii Feldman.  After the formation of the Soviet Union, he held a variety of official and semi-official music administration posts. He died April 1951 in Staraya Ruza. His son, Alexander Kron, was a Soviet playwright.

Style
Krein's pioneering spirit had led him to incorporate the intonations and styles of both sacred and secular Jewish music into a relatively advanced idiom that was as influenced by  French impressionism as it was by the music of his friend Alexander Scriabin.
Krein's own Jewish heritage was a constant source of inspiration; there are a number of instrumental works whose titles bear quite obvious witness to this, such as the Caprice Hebraique, Op. 24, and the Jewish Sketches for clarinet and string quartet. In 1921, he composed Kaddish for tenor soloist, choir, and orchestra.  From the mid-'20s on, he also wrote music for plays given by Moscow's Jewish Drama Theater.  There is also a large amount of music that is either purely classical in design or Soviet in nature. In the latter category are works like the revolutionary opera Zagmuk (1930), the Threnody in Memory of Lenin (1925), and the somewhat amusingly titled U.S.S.R., Shock Brigade of the World Proletariat (1925).

Selected works
 Prologue for viola and piano, op. 2a (1902–1911/1927)
 Five Préludes for piano, op. 3 (1903–1906)
 Poème Quator for string quartet, op. 9 (1909)
 Jewish Sketches for clarinet and string quartet, op. 12 (1914, reprinted 2008 by Edition Silvertrust)
 Elegy for violin, cello and piano, op. 16 (1913)
 3 Lieder des Ghetto (3 Songs from the Ghetto) for soprano and piano, op. 23
 Sei mir Schwesterlein (1916)
Wo bist du? (1917)
Eine Träne (1915–1916) 
 Caprice Hébraïque, op. 24 (1917)
 Kaddisch, Symphonic Cantata for tenor, mixed choir and large orchestra, op. 33 (1921–1922)
 Symphony No.1 for large orchestra, op. 35 (1922–1925)
 Piano Sonata (1925)
 2 Hebräische Lieder (2 Hebrew Songs) for voice and piano, op. 39 (1926)
 Trauer-Ode to Lenin for Mixed Choir and large orchestra, op. 40 (1925–1926)
 Aria for violin and piano, op. 41 (1927)
 2 Pieces on Turkish Themes, for solo piano Op.46 (1941)
 Ornamente (Орнаменти, Три песни без слов), 3 Songs without Words for voice and piano, op. 42 (1924/1927)
 Jewish Melody for cello and piano, op. 43 (1928)
 Zagmuk, opera (1929–1930)
 Laurencia, ballet (1939)

References

External links 
 Alexander Krein 3 Sketches on Hebrew Themes for Clarinet Quintet, Op.12 Soundbites and discussion
 

1883 births
1951 deaths
Musicians from Nizhny Novgorod
People from Nizhegorodsky Uyezd
Russian Jews
Soviet Jews
20th-century classical composers
Jewish classical composers
Russian opera composers
Male opera composers
Russian ballet composers
Russian male classical composers
Soviet composers
Soviet male composers
20th-century Russian male musicians
Moscow Conservatory alumni